Major General William Augustus Fitzgerald Lane Fox-Pitt,  (28 January 1896 – 26 April 1988) was a British Army officer who served in both the First World War and Second World War.

Early life
Fox-Pitt was born in London on 28 January 1896, to Lieutenant Colonel W. A. Fox-Pitt, a soldier with the Grenadier Guards. For his education he attended Charterhouse School before following his father into the army, joining the Cheshire Regiment in August 1914.

First World War and interwar career
Fox-Pitt sailed for France with the Cheshire Regiment in October 1914 before transferring to the newly formed Welsh Guards the following year. While with the regiment, he was wounded in the fighting at the Hohenzollern Redoubt. Commanding a company at Ginchy on the Somme in 1916, he won a Military Cross. The citation for the award stated:

Fox-Pitt was injured once more during 1918.

Remaining with the Welsh Guards after the war, Fox-Pitt commanded the regiment's 1st Battalion from 1934 to 1939, which was followed by command of the whole regiment.

Second World War and retirement
During the Battle of France, Fox-Pitt was made an acting brigadier and given command of the 20th Guards Brigade. It sailed to France with two battalions, to defend Boulogne. During the Battle of Boulogne, the brigade held the town for two days before being evacuated. For his "leadership and personal example" during the battle, Fox-Pitt was awarded a Distinguished Service Order. He then commanded the 5th Guards Armoured Brigade. He was then given the acting rank of major general, and placed in command of the East Kent District in 1943. He reverted to his prior rank and was dispatched to Africa, where he commanded the 27th (N Rhodesia) Infantry Brigade.

From 1945 to 1947, Fox-Pitt was aide-de-camp to King George VI, granted the honorary rank of major general, and retired from the army.

Later life
Fox-Pitt was a member of HM Bodyguard of the Honourable Corp of Gentlemen-at-Arms between 1947 and 1966 and was also Standard Bearer from 1961 to 1963. He was also appointed Deputy Lieutenant for Dorset in 1957.

An enthusiastic hunter, Fox-Pitt enjoyed shooting and fishing and was chair of the Blackmoor Vale hunt. He died at the age of 92 and his ashes were interred at Caundle Marsh, Dorset.

References

External links
British Army Officers 1939–1945
Generals of World War II

1896 births
1988 deaths
British Army generals of World War II
Recipients of the Military Cross
Companions of the Distinguished Service Order
British Army personnel of World War I
Military personnel from London
Welsh Guards officers
Cheshire Regiment soldiers
British Army brigadiers of World War II
British Army major generals